Mohammad Akram Khpalwāk is a politician in Afghanistan who was Governor of Farah province from 3 April 2012 to 1 December 2014.  Between March 2006 and April 2010, he served as Governor of Paktika province. 

Khpalwak attended the Kabul University Medical School. He became a leader of the Afghanistan Youth Society. He was appointed a representative of the Loya Jirga, the appointed body that drafted the new constitution prior to the first elections to the new Wolesi Jirga. He ran for a seat in the Wolesi Jirga, but earned only a small fraction of the popular vote.

In April 2017, Khpalwak succeeded the recently deceased Ahmed Gailani as chairman of the Afghan High Peace Council.

References

Governors of Paktika Province
Government ministers of Afghanistan
Politicians of Paktika Province
Living people
Year of birth missing (living people)
Kabul University alumni
Pashtun people